Joseph Farndale CBE KPM (1864–22 February 1954) was a British police officer who served as Chief Constable of Bradford City Police from 1900 to 1938.

Farndale was born in Wakefield and educated at Field House Academy in Aberford. He joined the police at the age of twenty and later became Chief Constable of Margate Borough Police. Leaving Margate he took on the role of chief constable of York City Police in 1897 before moving to Bradford in 1900 to succeed Roderick Ross, who had left for Edinburgh.

He was awarded the King's Police Medal (KPM) in 1914 and appointed Officer of the Order of the British Empire (OBE) in the 1920 civilian war honours and Commander of the Order of the British Empire (CBE) in the 1924 Birthday Honours.

Footnotes

1864 births
1954 deaths
People from Wakefield
British Chief Constables
Commanders of the Order of the British Empire
English recipients of the Queen's Police Medal